Jimmy Jack, born , also credited as Jimmy the Exploder, is the nom de plume of screenwriter Daniel Houghton, known for his work as co-writer of the 2008 film The Black Balloon.

The Black Balloon and awards
Jack (credited as Jimmy The Exploder) co-produced and co-wrote the screenplay for the Australian feature film The Black Balloon with director Elissa Down. The pair recruited Strictly Ballroom producer Tristram Miall to produce the film. The narrative is semi-autobiographical, mostly drawn from Down's childhood experiences, but she asked Jack to join her in writing the screenplay.

Jack and Down won Best Original Screenplay for the script at the 2008 Australian Film Institute Awards. Jack caused a minor controversy when, accepting his award, he read out a negative review of the film and said "fuck you" to the critic, for which he received a standing ovation.

Jack also shared with Down the 2007 Western Australian Premier's Book Award and the 2008 Australian Writer's Guild AWGIE Award for the screenplay.

Other film work
In 2009 it was reported that international model Gemma Ward (who acted in The Black Balloon) would be starring in Jack's next feature film Sex, Brains & Rock 'n' Roll. Jack described it as a 'zombie rockumentary' and told reporters that he was looking at Macaulay Culkin to play the other lead role. The film was not made.
Jack is working on two projects currently in development, a Smashing Pumpkins documentary titled The Arising and a film called Luka Magic.

Writing
Jack (as Jimmy The Exploder) has contributed to publications including The Guardian. His more notable publications have been social commentary on his hometown of Perth, and an obituary for his friend artist Matt Doust.

Exhibition work and distribution company
In 2010 Jack curated the John Hughes Retrospective at the Northbridge Piazza, funded by the City of Perth.

In 2013 Jack founded the film sales and distribution company Video Archives. The company was named after the video store Quentin Tarantino worked at in Los Angeles before his career took off.

Jack was one of the founders of the Perth Underground Film Festival (PUFF) which was part of the Perth Fringe Festival in 2015.

Henry Saw and the Museum of Perth
In 2015 Jack worked together with a group of prominent Western Australians to found the Museum of Perth. Jack owned Henry Saw cafe which was neighbours with the museum and named after the grocer who first roasted coffee beans in Perth.

Babooshka
Jack owned Babooshka cafe in Northbridge, Western Australia. In 2015 the cafe launched a series of 'freakshakes' that went viral and received international press.

Court appearances and convictions
In December 2018 Houghton appeared in Perth Magistrates Court on various charges related to a domestic incident with his then 21-year-old girlfriend for which Houghton was later convicted. He was also convicted in a district court on another count related to the same incident. In March 2019, Judge Ronald Birmingham issued a custodial sentence to Houghton, which was fully suspended. However, he was issued with a lifetime restraining order and fined a total of $5000 (of which $3000 was to be paid to his former girlfriend as compensation). Judge Birmingham also described Houghton as "a very capable and successful person".

In popular culture
Jack was spoofed by Australian filmmakers Henry and Aaron in Henry & Aaron's 7 Steps to Superstardom, The Ballad of Danny Danielson and Henry & Aaron’s ABC2 Xmas Quickie. Their main character Danny "The Dynamite" Danielson was based on Jack's pseudonym Jimmy The Exploder, and their experiences working with him. Perth actor James Helm plays Danny Danielson.

References

External links

Jimmy Jack on Myspace

Living people
Australian screenwriters
People from Perth, Western Australia
1978 births